Sandock-Austral was a South African defence company formed through the 1971 merger of the Austral armaments company and Sandock Ltd dockyards, as a subsidiary of the Gencor mining group.

The company was absorbed into Land Systems OMC, part of BAE Systems.

Sandock-Austral has developed a number of notable products, such as:

 The Ratel infantry fighting vehicle.
 The Eland Mk2 armoured car.
 Mamba Mk2 and Romad series of mine-protected armoured personnel carriers.

It was also responsible for the construction of the SAS Drakensberg, South Africa's most sophisticated indigenous warship.

References

Government-owned companies of South Africa
Defence companies of South Africa
Defunct companies of South Africa